The SBX World Cup Montafon a snowboard competition that takes place annually in the Montafon in Vorarlberg (Austria) as part of the FIS Snowboard World Cup.

The competitions are held at the Hochjoch in Schruns in the Silvretta Montafon ski area. The following disciplines have been carried out in the Montafon so far: snowboard cross (SBX) and parallel slalom (PSL). The snowboard cross route is 980 meters long and the parallel slalom route is 280 meters long.

History 
Snowboarding was added to the FIS competition program in May 1994, the first Snowboard World Championship was held in 1996.

In the 2010/11 season, the Snowboard Cross World Cup was held once in Lech am Arlberg. Then they looked up a region in Vorarlberg for a suitable place to present the snowboard cross optimally. The Montafon turned out to be suitable for this. The first Snowboard Cross World Cup took place in December 2012.

In December 2014, the snowboard cross had to be cancelled due to warm temperatures. Instead, a parallel slalom and mixed team competition were held. Due to the warm temperatures, snow production was impossible for the track in 2018, so that year, the snowboard cross had to be cancelled.

In the season 2020/21, due to policies regarding COVID-19, all races in the Montafon (FIS Ski Cross Weltcup, FIS Snowboard Cross World Cup) had to be postponed to 15 and 16 January 2021, and later be cancelled completely.

Standings

Women

Men

Team

External links 

 Website of the SBX World Cup Montafon

References 

FIS Snowboard World Cup
Ski areas in Austria
Vorarlberg
Sport in Vorarlberg
Sports venues in Austria
Recurring sporting events established in 1994